Polynucleobacter sinensis is an aerobic, chemo-organotrophic, catalase- and oxidase-positive,  free-living bacterium of the genus Polynucleobacter, isolated from a freshwater pond in China. The species represents planktonic bacteria (bacterioplankton) dwelling in non-acidic freshwater systems. The species name refers to the origin of the type strain from China.

References

External links
Type strain of Polynucleobacter sinensis at BacDive -  the Bacterial Diversity Metadatabase

Burkholderiaceae
Bacteria described in 2016